The Washington Stealth are a lacrosse team based in Everett, Washington. The team plays in the National Lacrosse League (NLL). The 2010 season was the inaugural season in Washington, but the 11th in franchise history (previously the San Jose Stealth and Albany Attack). The Stealth finished first overall, and captured the first NLL Championship in franchise history.

Regular season

Conference standings

Game log
Reference:

Playoffs

Game log
Reference:

Transactions

New players
 Jason Bloom - acquired in trade
 Tyler Codron - acquired in trade
 Lewis Ratcliff - acquired in trade
 Luke Wiles - acquired in trade

Players not returning
 Aaron Bold - traded
 Colin Doyle - traded
 Mike Kirk - traded
 Frank Resetarits - traded

Trades

Entry draft
The 2009 NLL Entry Draft took place on September 9, 2009. The Stealth selected the following players:

Roster

See also
2010 NLL season

References

Washington
Washington Stealth seasons
2010 in sports in Washington (state)